Shu may refer to:

China
 Sichuan, China, officially abbreviated as Shu (蜀)
 Shu (kingdom) (conquered by Qin in 316 BC), an ancient kingdom in modern Sichuan
 Shu Han (221–263) during the Three Kingdoms Period 
 Western Shu (405–413), also known as Qiao Shu, a state founded by Qiao Zong during the Eastern Jin Dynasty 
 Former Shu (907–925) during the Five Dynasties and Ten Kingdoms period 
 Later Shu (934–965) during the Five Dynasties and Ten Kingdoms period
 The Book of Documents (Shū 書)

People
 Shu, the guitarist in the Japanese rock band, BACK-ON
 Shu (surname), Chinese surname 舒
 Frank Shu (born 1943), Chinese-American professor of astronomy
 Quan-Sheng Shu, American physicist
, Japanese footballer
 Will Shu (born 1979), American businessman, the co-founder and CEO of Deliveroo

Fictional characters
 Shu, in the Xbox 360 game Blue Dragon
 Shu, in the Dragon Ball franchise
 Shu (Suikoden), in the video game Suikoden II
 Shu Shirakawa, in the Super Robot Wars video game series
 Shū, in the Fist of the North Star manga and anime franchise
 Shu, in the manga series Hikaru no Go
 Shu Kurenai, in the manga and toyline Beyblade Burst
 Shuzo "Shu" Matsutani, in the anime series Now and Then, Here and There and Legendz
 Shu Ouma, in the anime and manga series Guilty Crown
 Shū or Drew (Pokémon), in the Pokémon series
 Shu Murakami, in the 2017 film Life
 Shū Tsukiyama, in the series Tokyo Ghoul
 Shu Todoroki, in the film Cars 2
 Shu Sakamaki (逆巻 シュウ), in the visual novel and anime Diabolik Lovers
 Shu Amiguchi, in the video game 13 Sentinels: Aegis Rim
 Shu Itsuki (斎宮 宗), in the game Ensemble Stars!!

Acronyms
SHU may be an acronym for:
Finnish Elite Athletes' Union, a trade union in Finland
Scoville Heat Unit, a measurement of hotness or spiciness in food
Security Housing Unit, a solitary confinement space in a maximum security prison
Special Handling Unit, a super maximum security prison located in Sainte-Anne-des-Plaines, Quebec
Scottish Hockey Union, governs field hockey in Scotland

Universities
Sacred Heart University, Fairfield, Connecticut, US
Seton Hall University, South Orange, New Jersey, US
Seton Hill University, Greensburg, Pennsylvania, US
Shanghai University, China
Sheffield Hallam University, England
Shih Hsin University, Taipei, Taiwan

Other uses
 Shu (Egyptian god)
 Shu, the Kazakh name for the Chu (river) in Kyrgyzstan and Kazakhstan
 Shu, Kazakhstan (disambiguation)
 Shu (朱), a unit of Japanese Tokugawa coinage used in the Nishuban and Isshuban

See also
Shoo (disambiguation)

Japanese masculine given names